The Replacement is a 2021 Spanish–Belgian thriller drama film directed by Óscar Aibar. It stars Ricardo Gómez, Vicky Luengo and Pere Ponce.

Plot 
It is set in 1982. A police officer from Madrid moves to the coast. He gets involved in an investigation that takes him to a community of nazis enjoying their retirement in the Costa Blanca.

Cast

Production 
A joint Spain–Belgium co-production, The Replacement was produced by Tornasol, Voramar Films S.L., Isaba Producciones Cinematográficas A.I.E. and Entre Chien et Loup with the participation of RTVE, À Punt Media, the collaboration of Amazon Prime Video and support from ICAA and ICV Generalitat Valenciana. The film was written by Óscar Aibar (the director) alongside María Luisa Calderón. It was shot in Dénia and other locations across the Valencia region. Filming began by mid September 2020.

The film had a budget over 2.8 million €.

Release 
The Replacement was presented at the 24th Málaga Film Festival (FCME) on 7 June 2021, as part of the festival's official selection. It was also screened at the 36th . Distributed by Karma Films, the film was theatrically released in Spain on 29 October 2021.

Reception 
Pere Vall of Fotogramas gave the film 3 out of 5 stars, considering it to be "an austere and impeccable recreation of 1980s Spain", highlighting Pere Ponce's performance.
Beatriz Martínez of El Periódico de Catalunya gave it 3 out of 5 stars, deeming it a "good thriller", but also a reflection on "the miseries of our times" and the rise of the far right. Raquel Hernández Luján of HobbyConsolas gave the film 60 out of 100 points, praising the good recreation of the 1980s (owing to production design and art direction) while negatively assessing the "overly stilted" performances as well as the "clumsy" and "predictable" resolution. Carmen L. Lobo of La Razón gave it 3 out of 5 stars, writing that it was "superbly set", and that it constituted "a sober, dry and razor-sharp" film. Anton Merikaetxebarria of El Correo gave it 2 out of 3 stars, considering it to be a "different, timely and interesting film".

Awards and nominations 

|-
| align ="center" rowspan ="2" | 2022 || rowspan ="2"| 9th Feroz Awards || Best Actor (film) || Ricardo Gómez ||  || rowspan="2" | 
|-
| Best Supporting Actor (film) || Pere Ponce || 
|}

See also 
 List of Spanish films of 2021

References

External links 
 The Replacement at ICAA's Catálogo de Cinespañol

2021 films
2021 thriller drama films
Films set in 1982
Films set in Spain
Spanish thriller films
Belgian thriller films
Films shot in the Valencian Community
Films about Nazi fugitives
Films shot in the province of Alicante
Films set in the Mediterranean Sea
Tornasol Films films
2020s Spanish-language films
2020s Spanish films